Senegalia venosa is a species of plant in the family Fabaceae. It is found in Eritrea and Ethiopia. It is threatened by habitat loss.

References

venosa
Flora of Ethiopia
Flora of Eritrea
Vulnerable plants
Taxonomy articles created by Polbot